Commodification of the womb is the process by which services performed by the female womb are offered for sale and purchased on the market. Basically it is commercial surrogacy viewed from a Marxian standpoint. The market transaction reduces the womb to merely a service provider in the marketplace. In Marxian terms, the womb in its commodified state has both exchange value and use value. Market transactions involving the services of women's wombs became increasingly common in the early twenty-first century. Such transactions are generally relied upon by those unable to conceive and those who are willing to pay someone else to bear pregnancy. Commodification of the womb raises several ethical and legal questions, which have expanded from questions regarding the rights of surrogates and biological parents, and the legitimacy of a child resulting from the transaction, to questions regarding transnational surrogacy within a global market.

History

Background
Through modernization of reproductive technology, the options for having a child has expanded to include artificial insemination, in vitro fertilization, and surrogacy as possible solutions when faced with infertility. A woman may essentially offer to rent her womb for the gestation of a child who will be given to another person following the birth of the child. Surrogacy has been a practice throughout history yet has become more popular in the modern day. In the Bible, Rachel who was infertile, gives her handmaid Bilhah to her husband Jacob to bear him children. The two children, Dan and Naphtali whom Bilhah gave birth to were given names by Rachel who was considered their mother following birth. This was the earliest biblical example of surrogacy. From the Middle Ages to modern times, other reproductive services have also been supplied for a fee. For example, in the Middle Ages a wet nurse would feed and care for another woman's child, in exchange for payment. These reproductive services often share a common thread of a woman of lesser economic means supplying either gestation or care of another woman's child for an individual fee or as part of her employment

New reproductive technologies
In the late twentieth and early twenty-first centuries, artificial insemination made impregnation possible without sexual intercourse. Thus the market for commodification of the womb was transformed. Through the advancements of modern technology, potential parent(s) have the ability to enter into a market transaction with a someone who agrees to gestate a child, either of their own egg or that of a surrogate, with the contractual obligation of turning this child over upon birth. Having a child born of a commercial surrogate could be considered a luxury good. Luxury goods are typically only available to those with significant means, beyond that of necessities. It could be considered that, just as in the Biblical cases of handmaids being asked to conceive children, early twenty-first century people offering their wombs to the market would also be of lesser economic means.

Early markets
Viewing the womb as a commodified good allows for the understanding of the market supply, demand, and transactions that take place with a part of the human body. The market for commercial surrogacy began to take shape in the late 1970s; one of the more prominent figures in this market was attorney Noel Keane of Michigan, United States. Keane and other entrepreneurs saw a market for the womb, and hence the commodification of the womb began.
 
Keane started brokering deals, for a fee, between potential surrogates and parents until he found out that it was illegal for a genetic parent to sell their child to another person in the state of Michigan. Keane's business model was to have fathers contribute sperm and the surrogate mothers provided eggs. The surrogate mothers were genetically related to the child, while the non-birth mothers were not. Such surrogacy arrangements were illegal in some states on the basis that the non-birth mothers were paying the biological mothers for their genetically related children. The state of Michigan was one such state that enacted laws forbidding these surrogacy arrangements, thereby making Keane's business model illegal. The main purpose of these laws was to prevent the sale of infants as if they were property. Some states viewed surrogate contracts as void, the payment for a child was illegal, and/or viewed artificial insemination as adultery, if the couple was not married.

To avoid the legal issues Keane thought women would volunteer, without pay, to become surrogates out of an altruistic motivation. However, without the promise of financial compensation, Keane found a sharp decline in the number of women who volunteered. In the early 1980s Keane moved his commercial surrogacy business to Florida, where laws were more lenient. Florida also had no laws regarding the exchange of money for infants. A commercial surrogacy broker could be viewed as a capitalist organizing production and offering a product to the market. This raised the question of whether women and children are being viewed not as human beings but as commodities of the market, being bought and sold for the highest prices. At the outset of commercial surrogacy, the laws in place in the United States were not equipped to handle the resulting legal and ethical questions that would arise. As with many modern markets, womb commodification has moved from local markets to outsourcing in foreign countries.

Conceptualization
Commodification refers to the process by which goods and services are transformed into commodities to be bought and sold in the market. In Capital, from the Fetishism of the Commodity and its Secrets, Karl Marx describes a commodity as a thing. Marx calls commodities trivial, strange, and use values to satisfy human needs. Marx conceptualizes the commodity as something man transforms from raw materials into a final good. Marx is describing things which are not human, and thus the commodity of the womb cannot be independent of the woman. The womb gains value in the market through exchange value and use value. Women's overall market participation is growing both as consumers and as producers. The womb, a product owned only by women, being sold to other women creates a market where women are predominantly the consumer as well as the sole owners of the product. It is difficult, if not impossible, to separate the product of the womb from the human being. Outside of the human, the womb has little value, but once its functions can be traded for profit on the market it is of interest to everyone.

Ethics 
Womb commodification raises ethical questions regarding exploitation of poor/low income women, the rights of the child and the natural biological function of the human body.  The commodification of the womb also tries to balance against a woman's right to enter in to a contract and to make decisions regarding her own body. Womb commodification could be viewed as economic agents engaged in free market trade. The commodification argument asks whether women are being given control over their body, or whether they are being exploited for their individual body parts with monetary incentives.

An ethical argument against womb commodification is that it allows the rich to take advantage of the willingness of poor women to perform any job as long as they are able to earn a wage. A woman may choose to commodify her womb for money because she is faced with no other profitable options for employment, however the payment arrangement and monetary value varies from case to case. 

Since the surrogate functions as a gestational carrier, only carrying the pregnancy to delivery; the surrogate has no legal claim or responsibility to the child after pregnancy. This causes an ethical issues regarding the rights of the child. There is no claim to the gestational carrier after birth which usually means the child cannot obtain any information about the carrier or possible siblings.

Women in the modernized world often choose to defy nature and carry children with no biological relationship to them. This transforms the nature of a woman's bodies function into a commercial transaction.

Legal issues
Reproductive technology is a relatively recent phenomenon with little universal regulation.  Surrogates, clinics, and commissioning couples often choose the market that is most favorable, beneficial, or profitable to them. Many individual states in the United States view the gestational mother as the legal mother, which can prove problematic when determining rights of the surrogate versus the rights of the commissioning couple.

Opposition and challenges to surrogacy agreements most often relate to the nature of the surrogacy contract. One of the legally debated questions is whether the contract is granting a woman the right to sell the service of her labor through womb rental or whether the surrogate and the commissioning parents are entering into an agreement to sell/purchase a child. One of the most controversial legal issues is determining the rights of surrogate as the birth mother versus contractual obligations of the surrogate as a party to a contract. A mother is commonly defined as a woman who has given birth or legally adopted a child. The law often does not keep pace with technology. With the advancements of surrogacy and the invention of commercial surrogacy, what it means to be a mother will inevitability need to be redefined.

A question at the forefront of legal debates is whether the birth mother may be required to relinquish her rights to the child, or whether the biological parents’ rights supersede the rights of the birth mother. In order to avoid the sale of a human, which is illegal, the focus of a surrogacy contract needs to focus on the legal use of the surrogate's womb to be enforceable. There is little case law on which to rely and this legal battle is made more complex when the element of transnational surrogacy is added. Birth often confers nationally and citizenship. With transnational surrogacy being a common form of commercial surrogacy, there is growing demand for international regulation of this burgeoning market.

Surrogacy laws by country
There are two types of surrogacy: commercial surrogacy and altruistic surrogacy. Commercial surrogacy is when the surrogate offers the rental of her womb to the market for financial gain. Conversely, the surrogate generally does not profit from the rental of her womb in altruistic surrogacy.

The following countries legally permit both commercial surrogacy and altruistic surrogacy: Russian Federation, Ukraine, Belarus, Georgia, Armenia, Cyprus, India, South Africa, and the United States (in the states of Arkansas, California, Florida, Illinois, Texas, Massachusetts, and Vermont).

Other countries permit altruistic surrogacy: Australia, Canada (except Quebec), the United Kingdom, Netherlands, Denmark, Hungary, Israel, and United States (in the states of New York, New Jersey, New Mexico, Nebraska, Virginia, Oregon, and Washington).

There are also countries in which any form of surrogacy is illegal, Germany, France, Spain, Italy, Switzerland, Austria, Norway, Sweden, Iceland, Estonia, Moldova, Turkey, Saudi Arabia, Pakistan, China, Japan, and the United States (in the states of Arizona, Michigan, Indiana, North Dakota). Due to varying options within a home country many people seeking a commercial surrogate choose to seek markets abroad. India legalized commercial surrogacy in 2001. Legalization was pushed forward with the hope that medical tourism, and specifically reproductive tourism in India would increase.

Economic and social impacts
With a lack of regulation in the commercial surrogacy market, payments to surrogates can vary depending on the terms of the individual contract.  India is a favored location for commercial surrogacy due to the lower costs. By some estimates, those wishing to enter in to a commercial surrogacy contract could save as much as $70,000 in India versus the United States.

Social benefits
By becoming commercial surrogates women in India are enabling themselves to improve not only their lives but also the lives of their families. It is common for surrogates to have had limited access to education, which could limit the opportunities for employment in the market. Payment for surrogacy varies by contract, estimates range from the equivalent of three times what the head of household could make in a month, to earning in nine months an amount that would take fifteen years worth of work. This amount of money can provide access to better housing, food, education, and sanitation, that would otherwise not be probable.

Former surrogates also have the ability to become agents for surrogacy clinics. Agents, for a fee, facilitate a surrogate's doctor's visits and look out for the care and wellbeing of the surrogate throughout the course of her pregnancy. Becoming an agent allows the woman to have several patients and she is able to collect fees from each of them, which may further improve her financial situation. It was expected that profits for commercial surrogacy would reach as high as six billion dollars by 2012.

6 September 2018, Section 377 of the Indian Penal Code is declared unconstitutional in India. After this path breaking decision, surrogacy, especially single father surrogacy will see a boost among LGBT community.

Clinics
When a woman signs a contract to become a gestational carrier she is subject to hormone administration and embryo transplantation to become impregnated. Many, but not all surrogates move to gestational hostels and receive better medical treatment and care than they would receive were they giving birth to their own child free of the obligation of a contract. Nutrition, health, and rest are all monitored as part of the contract, with the wellbeing of the fetus often paramount to that of the surrogate.

Many clinics that broker transnational surrogacy prefer women who have already given birth, as the clinics have evidence of a viable uterus. The clinics may also prefer women who have their own children, with the hope that the surrogate will not bond with the fetus. Surrogacy contracts focus on the rental of an unused womb, with the belief that the fetus is the property of another. Many surrogates only receive full payment for their service if the full duration of the pregnancy is met. The appeal for foreign parents of transnational surrogacy is due to the lower costs and wage demands than they would find in their home country.

Dr. Nayna Patel runs the Akanksha clinic, in Anand, India. At first most of the clients seeking fertility services from the Akanksha clinic were Indian, but their clientele has expanded to Westerners also seeking a child. Many come to this distant clinic as the fees are too high in their own country - foreign couples are seeking lower priced alternatives to local surrogacy, and foreign surrogates may be willing to accept a lower fee. Surrogates at the Akanksha clinic have the possibility of making $5500 for this transaction, a sum of money that is significant in providing for a family, education, housing, and wellbeing when compared to other alternatives.

Citizenship and transnational surrogacy

Citizenship
Citizenship of a child has traditionally been established through jus soli, right of the soil, and/or jus sanguinis, right of blood.  Surrogacy challenges the traditional view of citizenship, by redefining what it means to be a mother. Nations must now consider if a mother is the person who physically gave birth to the child, the one who provided her ovum, or the one who will care for the child.

In July 2010, consuls general from Belgium, France, Germany, Italy, the Netherlands, Poland, Spain, and the Czech Republic sent letters to surrogacy clinics in Mumbai, India, to direct potential clients from these countries to seek guidance from their consulates before entering into surrogacy contracts. These countries have varying surrogacy laws, and many of their citizens have faced difficulties upon trying to gain citizenship rights for children born in India.

Manji
One of the most well known cases of problematic transnational surrogacy and lineage is that of the baby girl known as Manji, born in 2008, in India. Manji's birth was the result of a commercial surrogacy contract between her Japanese parents and her Indian surrogate. Before Manji's birth, her parents divorced, and her commissioning mother refused to claim her. Under Indian law, an infant's passport may only be issued in conjunction with the mother's. Since neither her Japanese or Indian mother would claim Manji, for a brief time she was not considered a citizen of Japan, India, or any other country. It was not until her paternal grandmother claimed her, accompanied by a lengthy legal battle, that Manji was able to apply for a passport and citizenship.

See also
 Sperm theft

References

Feminist economics
Surrogacy
Legal issues in pregnancy
Human commodity